Culen may refer to:
 Culén, 10th-century Scottish king
Culen, a surname; notable people with the name include:
 Monica Culen, Austrian businesswoman and philanthropist

See also 
 Cullen (disambiguation)
 Culin (disambiguation)
 Kulen